Daniel, Dan or Danny Coughlan may refer to:

Dan Coughlan (Blackrock hurler), played for Cork from 1894 until 1903
Dan Coughlan (St Finbarr's hurler), played for Cork from 1916 until 1919

See also
Daniel Coghlan
Daniel Coughlin